Nazir Ahmad Bhatti was a Pakistani judge who served as the 7th chief justice of the Federal Shariat Court from 19 July 1994 to 4 January 1997.

Bhatti started his legal practice as a civil judge in 1960 and was later appointed as 
district and session Judge in 1972. He became chairperson of Services Tribunal in 1982 and deputy secretary, Law Department secretary for provisional Assembly of the North-West Frontier Province for three years.

He was elevated as Peshawar High Court judge in 1983 and the Federal Shariat Court judge on 28 October 1991 until he was appointed as chief justice of the Federal Shariat Court on 19 July 1994.

References 

Chief justices of the Federal Shariat Court
Judges of the Peshawar High Court
Year of birth missing
Place of birth missing